Tiberiu Rusu was a Romanian athlete. He competed in the men's high jump at the 1928 Summer Olympics.

References

External links
  

Year of birth missing
Possibly living people
Athletes (track and field) at the 1928 Summer Olympics
Romanian male high jumpers
Olympic athletes of Romania
Place of birth missing